The Black Mask (Italian: Maschera nera) is a 1952 Italian historical adventure film directed by Filippo Walter Ratti and starring Cesare Danova,  Franca Marzi and Nino Pavese. It earned a little over a hundred million lire at the box office.

Synopsis
A mysterious masked horseman fights for justice for the poor.

Cast
Cesare Danova as Villeneuve
Franca Marzi as Henriette
Nino Pavese as Dupont
Lia Di Leo as Hippolite
Renato Chiantoni as Damprepois
Gianna Baragli as Valentine
 Anna Maria Padoan as Louise

References

Bibliography 
 Chiti, Roberto & Poppi, Roberto. Dizionario del cinema italiano: Dal 1945 al 1959. Gremese Editore, 1991.

External links
 

1952 films
1950s Italian-language films
Italian black-and-white films
Italian adventure films
1952 adventure films
1950s Italian films
Films directed by Filippo Walter Ratti